Robert Teah (born September 3, 1982) is a Liberian football midfielder who last played for LPRC Oilers.

Teah was also capped for the Liberia national football team. He made his debut for the senior national team, the Lone Star, at the First National Bank (FNB) stadium in Johannesburg. The Lone Star lost the match to South Africa's Bafana Bafana in the qualifiers of the 2002 Nations Cup.

External links 

1982 births
Living people
Liberian footballers
Association football midfielders
Mighty Barrolle players
LPRC Oilers players
Liberia international footballers